Tancun Station, formerly known as Saimachang Station (literally Racecourse Station) whilst in the planning stage, is a station on Line 5 of the Guangzhou Metro. It is located under Huacheng Avenue in the Tianhe District, near Guangzhou Racecourse. It opened on 28 December 2009.

Station layout

Exits

Around the station
 Happy Valley

References

Railway stations in China opened in 2009
Guangzhou Metro stations in Tianhe District